The National Repository Library is an agency under the Finnish  Ministry of Education and Culture that collects lesser-used items donated by other libraries. Such centralized collection saves storage costs and avoids the items being destroyed as the libraries can no longer justify keeping them in their collections.

References

External links
 

Libraries in Finland